Desmia albisectalis is a moth in the family Crambidae. It was described by Paul Dognin in 1905. It is found in Mexico (Tabasco) and Costa Rica.

References

Moths described in 1905
Desmia
Moths of Central America